Oostduinkerke is a place in the Belgian province of West Flanders, where it is located on the southern west coast of Belgium.
 
Once a municipality of its own, Oostduinkerke now is a sub-municipality in the municipality of Koksijde.

The name "Oostduinkerke" translates as 'East Dunkirk'. The town originally shared its name with the city of Dunkirk in current-day France; therefore, in the 13th century, 'Oost-' was added to its name to avoid confusion with its namesake further to the west.

Oostduinkerke lies amidst a dune area (approximately 2.4 km2), which is now a protected nature reserve.

Oostduinkerke's sandy beach stretches from 250 to 700 m at ebb-tide and extends over 30 km, via De Panne to the beach of Dunkirk (France), which explains why Oostduinkerke is popular with sand yachters and parakarters.

Shrimp fishing on horseback

 
Oostduinkerke is known for its shrimpers on horseback, a considerable tourist attraction. The practice was once common across the coastal areas of the North Sea, but today it is only present in Oostduinkerke, where 17 fishers remain active as of 2021.

Sights
Oostduinkerke has several museums. The National Fishery Museum gives a historical survey of Flemish fishery and shows among other things scale models of fishing boats from 800 AD up to the present,  and an original fisherman's cottage. Other museums are: 'The Key and Lock Museum' (a unique historical survey of 3,000 years of keys and locks),  a regional museum 't Krekelhof (a huge collection of craft objects and curiosities from the 19th century), and Florishof (old crafts and folkloristic objects).

Oostduinkerke is also home to Koksijde Golf ter Hille, a par-72 golf course.

The British Military Cemetery (1940–1945) bears witness to British sacrifices in the Battle of Dunkirk.

Images

References

External links 

National Fishery Museum
Map of the Flemish coast

Populated places in West Flanders
Koksijde

et:Wulpen